Chile is an original member of the IMF, joining the organization on December 31, 1945. The IMF would have a strong influence over the economy of Chile through the post-World War Two era of the 20th century, especially during the dictatorship of Augusto Pinochet.

History of IMF - Chile relations

Overthrow of Allende and Rise of the Chicago Boys 
In 1973 the democratically elected government of marxist Salvador Allende was overthrown in a coup launched by the military of Chile. General Augusto Pinochet became leader of the nation and he set the nation on a path of laissez-faire economics, hoping to gain favor with the United States. Pinochet gave control of the economy to a group of economist who became known as the "Chicago Boys" due to many of them having been trained in economics at the University of Chicago. In the immediate wake of the coup inflation had reached a record annual rate of over 500%, and amongst the first goals of the Chicago Boys was to bring this under control. The overthrow of Allende was seen as a positive development by the major world financial institutions, and the IMF quickly began talks with the new government. IMF gave increasingly large loans to the junta, providing 79 million dollars in loans in both 1975 and 76. Inflation would decrease through the 70s, and the government budget was cut as the public sector was increasingly cut.

Increased IMF Intervention 
By the early 1980s Chile's economic experiment took a turnt for the worst. Inflation began to increase again and the amount of the population in poverty increased drastically, reaching over 40% of the population The shock economics of the Chicago Boys lost favor with the dictatorship, and one by one they were forced out and replaced by more moderate economists. These economists were not given the same amount of freedom to experiment, and so the influence of the IMF over the economy greatly increased. Even more free market reforms were passed, and the size of IMF loans was drastically increased. In 1985 alone over 800 million dollars was loaned out to Chile.

Modern Day 
Since the return to democracy Chile has taken loans from the IMF twice, in 1983 and in 2020.

Within the IMF Chile currently contributes over 1,700,000 SDRs, giving it a vote share of 18,908.

References 

Economy of Chile
International Monetary Fund relations